Raúl Macías Guevara (July 28, 1934 in Mexico City – March 23, 2009) was a Mexican professional boxer, actor and boxing trainer. He took the NBA World Bantamweight Championship on March 9, 1955.   Widely known as "Ratón" Macías, or "Mouse" Macías, he won a bronze medal at the 1951 Pan American Games.

Early life and amateur career 
Macias was born on July 28, 1934, in Tepito, Distrito Federal, Mexico, a suburb of Mexico City. Macías had always expressed pride at being Mexican.

Macias began his amateur career at age fourteen, winning the National Junior Flyweight, Flyweight and Bantamweight titles. He won a bronze medal at the Pan American Games, and represented Mexico as a bantamweight at the 1952 Helsinki Olympic Games.   In the Olympics, he first defeated Angel Amaya of Venezuela in a unanimous decision, then lost to Gennady Garbuzov of the Soviet Union

1952 Olympic results
Below is the record of Raul Macias, a Mexican bantamweight boxer who competed at the 1952 Helsinki Olympics:

 Round of 32: defeated Angel Amaya (Venezuela) by decision, 3-0
 Round of 16: lost to Gennady Garbuzov (Soviet Union) by decision, 0-3

Professional career
On January 1, 1953, Macias debuted as a professional boxer with a first round knockout win against Memo Sanchez in Culiacán, Sinaloa, Mexico. Exactly one month later and in only his second fight, Macias had his first ten-round bout, and he outpointed Chucho Tello in Culiacán, a feat he would duplicate in their rematch.

Macias piled up a record of 8–0 with 2 knockouts and then faced Beto Couray on October 17, 1953 in Mexico City, for the Mexican Bantamweight title, lifting the national championship from Couray with a 12-round decision win. After 6 more wins, he challenged Nate Brooks on September 26, 1954 for the continental, NABF Bantamweight championship, which he took with a twelve-round decision in Mexico City.

Macías was one of Televisa's first boxing stars. Many of his fights were shown live on Televisa during the 1950s.

Taking the NBA world bantamweight title, 1955
National Boxing Association World Bantamweight champion Robert Cohen refused to defend his title against Macías, so the NBA decided to declare the title vacant and have Macias and Chamroen Songkitrat fight for the championship. It was Macías' first attempt at the world title and first fight abroad. On March 9, 1955 in San Francisco, California, Macías knocked out Songkiktrat in round eleven, taking the NBA World Bantamweight championship. Macias demonstrated great speed, boxing skill, and a powerful punch in his victory.  Macias floored Songkitrat twice in the sixth.  From the sixth on, Macias dominated the bout.  Songkitrat down for an eight count from a right in the eleventh.  After he was down again from a right to the head, referee Fred Apostoli, a former world champion, ended the bout thirty seconds into round eleven.

Next followed a series of non-title fights. In a non-title bout on June 16, 1955, Macías suffered his first defeat when he was knocked out 2:29 into the third round by Billy Peacock in Los Angeles. The final blows were two left hooks that left Macias with a broken jaw.  Macias, originally a 3-1 favorite, was down for a no count from a blow to his jaw earlier in the round.  The bout would be Macías' only defeat by knockout, and left him hospitalized for two days.

Macías' popularity followed him to California and Texas, where he fought a number of times.  On October 17, 1955, he defefated Cecil Schoonmaker in a ten-round decision in Corpus Christi, Texas. The non-title bout was considered drab by several ringsiders.

NBA bantamweight title defenses, and losing title
Macias had five victories before he defended his NBA world Bantamweight title for the first time against Leo Espinoza.  He defeated Espinoza, father of Philippines world boxing champion Luisito Espinoza, before a crowd of 50,000 in a tenth-round knockout on March 25, 1956 in Mexico City.  A blow to the ribs and a right to the head put Espinoza down for the full count 2:57 into the tenth round. Espinoza complained that the altitude of Mexico City robbed him of his full breathing capacity. 
 
Top rated Italian bantamweight Gaetano Annaloro fell to Macias on November 21, 1956 in a decisive ten-round decision in San Antonio, Texas.  The crowd of 4,500 shouted for more action in the carefully fought non-title bout.  Macias used his left effectively, and though he sustained a slightly bruised hand in the fourth, it did not hinder him in the remaining rounds.  Annaloro bobbed and weaved to maintain his defense, but was unable to gain an advantage over his opponent.

On February 10, 1957, Macias knocked out Juan Carcenas in Mexico City in the sixth round.  In their non-title bout, Macias put Carcenas to the mat ten times before he was counted out 1:30 into the sixth round.  Cardenas was down four times in the second, three in the third, once in the fifth and twice in the sixth.

After seven more non-title fight wins, Macias faced Dommy Ursua on June 15, 1957 in San Francisco in his second title defense. Macias was down for a four count from a left hook in the first, but retained his championship, knocking out Ursua in the eleventh before a crowd of 13,000.  Macias took the lead after the third round, and used his five-inch height advantage to score with telling body blows.  A cut above Ursua's eye slowed his progress after the sixth.  Macias was called for a low blow in the eleventh, not long before unleashing a right and two handed combination that led to the referee ending the match.

On November 6, 1957, he faced Alphonse Halimi at Los Angeles' Wrigley Field in  his last title bout. Halimi shook Macias with a hook to the jaw in the furious fourth round, though the bout featured no knockdowns. Macias lost his belt by a close and controversial 15-round split decision. Macias tried to close stronger in the final round, but was stopped by Halimi's offense.

Life after boxing
He retired from boxing in 1959 after outpointing Ernesto Parra in ten rounds in Mexico City. After a three-year break, he knocked out Chocolate Zambrano in the fifth as part of a charity event on October 13, 1962 in Guadalajara.  The match was his last.

In retirement, Macías appeared in a number of Mexican telenovelas, most notably 1990's "Mi Pequeña Soledad" ("My Small Soledad"), alongside Verónica Castro.  His best known movies included El Raton in 1957, La Culpa in 1966, and Llanto, risas e nocaut in 1974.  The black and white film El Raton, in which he starred, was directed by Chano Urueta. He co-starred with gifted boxer, four times world champion and Boxing Hall of Fame member, Ruben Olivares, ("el puas"), in Llanto, risas e nocaut.

After his participation in "Mi Pequeña Soledad", Macías dedicated himself to training boxers in a Mexico City gym. He compiled a professional boxing record of 41 wins and 2 losses, with 25 wins by knockout.  He died at the age of 74.

Professional record

|align="center" colspan=8|41 Wins (25 knockouts, 16 decisions), 2 Losses, 0 Draws
|-  style="text-align:center; background:#e3e3e3;"
|align="center" style="border-style: none none solid solid; background: #e3e3e3"|Res.
|align="center" style="border-style: none none solid solid; background: #e3e3e3"|Record
|align="center" style="border-style: none none solid solid; background: #e3e3e3"|Opponent
|align="center" style="border-style: none none solid solid; background: #e3e3e3"|Type
|align="center" style="border-style: none none solid solid; background: #e3e3e3"|Round
|align="center" style="border-style: none none solid solid; background: #e3e3e3"|Date
|align="center" style="border-style: none none solid solid; background: #e3e3e3"|Location
|align="center" style="border-style: none none solid solid; background: #e3e3e3"|Notes
|-align=center
|Win
|41–2
|align=left| Chocolate Zambrano
|TKO|| 5  || 1962-10-13
|align=left| Guadalajara, Jalisco, Mexico
|align=left|
|-align=center
|Win
|40–2
|align=left| Ernesto Parra
|UD|| 10 || 1959-02-28
|align=left| Mexico City, Distrito Federal, Mexico
|align=left|
|-align=center
|Win
|39–2
|align=left| Carmen Iacobucci
|KO|| 2  || 1959-02-08
|align=left| Mexicali, Baja California, Mexico
|align=left|
|-align=center
|Win
|38–2
|align=left| Luis Trejo
|KO|| 8  || 1959-01-25
|align=left| Ensenada, Baja California, Mexico
|align=left|
|-align=center
|Win
|37–2
|align=left| Kid Irapuato
|UD|| 10 || 1958-11-10
|align=left| Tijuana, Baja California, Mexico
|align=left|
|-align=center
|Loss
|36–2
|align=left| Alphonse Halimi
|SD|| 15 || 1957-11-06
|align=left| Wrigley Field, Los Angeles, California, United States
|align=left|
|-align=center
|Win
|36–1
|align=left| Pastor Gonzalez
|KO|| 5   || 1957-09-07
|align=left| Ciudad Juarez, Chihuahua, Mexico
|align=left|
|-align=center
|Win
|35–1
|align=left| Dommy Ursua
|TKO|| 11   || 1957-06-15
|align=left|Cow Palace, Daly City, California, United States
|align=left|
|-align=center
|Win
|34–1
|align=left| Juan Cardenas
|KO|| 6   || 1957-02-10
|align=left|Arena Mexico, Mexico City, Distrito Federal, Mexico
|align=left|
|-align=center
|Win
|33–1
|align=left| Gaetano Annaloro
|UD|| 10 || 1956-11-21
|align=left| San Antonio, Texas, United States
|align=left|
|-align=center
|Win
|32–1
|align=left| Johnny Hand
|KO|| 1  || 1956-11-13
|align=left| El Paso, Texas, United States
|align=left|
|-align=center
|Win
|31–1
|align=left| Ramon Young
|KO|| 2  || 1956-11-03
|align=left| Ciudad Obregon, Sonora, Mexico
|align=left|
|-align=center
|Win
|30–1
|align=left| Hector Ceballos
|KO|| 4  || 1956-10-27
|align=left| Hermosillo, Sonora, Mexico
|align=left|
|-align=center
|Win
|29–1
|align=left| Larry Bataan
|KO|| 6  || 1956-09-05
|align=left| Olympic Auditorium, Los Angeles, California, United States
|align=left|
|-align=center
|Win
|28–1
|align=left| Tanny Campo
|UD|| 10 || 1956-06-30
|align=left| Arena Mexico, Mexico City, Distrito Federal, Mexico
|align=left|
|-align=center
|Win
|27–1
|align=left| Adrian Kiriz
|KO|| 3  || 1956-05-26
|align=left| Monterrey, Nuevo León, Mexico
|align=left|
|-align=center
|Win
|26–1
|align=left| Mike Hernandez
|KO|| 4  || 1956-04-21
|align=left| Merida, Yucatán, Mexico
|align=left|
|-align=center
|Win
|25–1
|align=left| Leo Espinosa
|KO|| 10  || 1956-03-25
|align=left| Plaza Mexico, Mexico City, Distrito Federal, Mexico
|align=left|
|-align=center
|Win
|24–1
|align=left| Joe Chamaco
|KO|| 4  || 1956-01-29
|align=left| Irapuato, Guanajuato, Mexico
|align=left|
|-align=center
|Win
|23–1
|align=left| Lucio Torres
|KO|| 6  || 1956-01-15
|align=left| Veracruz, Veracruz, Mexico
|align=left|
|-align=center
|Win
|22–1
|align=left| Arturo Ruiz
|TKO|| 6  || 1955-12-11
|align=left| Acapulco, Guerrero, Mexico
|align=left|
|-align=center
|Win
|21–1
|align=left| Pedro Soto
|KO|| 6  || 1955-11-21
|align=left| Orizaba, Veracruz, Mexico
|align=left|
|-align=center
|Win
|20–1
|align=left| Cecil Schoonmaker
|UD|| 10 || 1955-10-17
|align=left| Memorial Auditorium, Corpus Christi, Texas, United States
|align=left|
|-align=center
|Loss
|19–1
|align=left| Billy Peacock
|TKO|| 3  || 1955-06-15
|align=left| Olympic Auditorium, Los Angeles, California, United States
|align=left|
|-align=center
|Win
|19–0
|align=left| Moe Mario
|TKO|| 5  || 1955-05-12
|align=left| San Antonio, Texas, United States
|align=left|
|-align=center
|Win
|18–0
|align=left| Memo Sanchez
|KO|| 6  || 1955-04-10
|align=left| Mexicali, Baja California, Mexico
|align=left|
|-align=center
|Win
|17–0
|align=left| Chamroen Songkitrat
|TKO|| 11  || 1955-03-09
|align=left| Cow Palace, Daly City, California, United States
|align=left|
|-align=center
|Win
|16–0
|align=left| Nate Brooks
|UD|| 12 || 1954-09-26
|align=left| Plaza Mexico, Mexico City, Distrito Federal, Mexico
|align=left|
|-align=center
|Win
|15–0
|align=left| Fili Nava
|UD|| 12 || 1954-05-22
|align=left| Arena Mexico, Mexico City, Distrito Federal, Mexico
|align=left|
|-align=center
|Win
|14–0
|align=left| Fili Nava
|UD|| 12 || 1954-04-10
|align=left| Arena Mexico, Mexico City, Distrito Federal, Mexico
|align=left|
|-align=center
|Win
|13–0
|align=left| Billy Peacock
|TKO|| 7  || 1954-03-13
|align=left| Arena Mexico, Mexico City, Distrito Federal, Mexico
|align=left|
|-align=center
|Win
|12–0
|align=left| Alberto Reyes
|UD || 10 || 1954-01-16
|align=left| Arena Mexico, Mexico City, Distrito Federal, Mexico
|align=left|
|-align=center
|Win
|11–0
|align=left| Lalo Gayosso
|TKO || 3  || 1953-12-23
|align=left| Mexico City, Distrito Federal, Mexico
|align=left|
|-align=center
|Win
|10–0
|align=left| Alberto Reyes
|TKO || 3  || 1953-11-21
|align=left| Arena Mexico, Mexico City, Distrito Federal, Mexico
|align=left|
|-align=center
|Win
|9–0
|align=left| Beto Couary
|UD || 12 || 1953-10-17
|align=left| Arena Mexico, Mexico City, Distrito Federal, Mexico
|align=left|
|-align=center
|Win
|8–0
|align=left| Genaro Serafin
|UD || 10 || 1953-09-12	
|align=left| Mexico City, Distrito Federal, Mexico
|align=left|
|-align=center
|Win
|7–0
|align=left| Otilio Galvan
|UD || 12 || 1953-08-01	
|align=left| Mexico City, Distrito Federal, Mexico
|align=left|
|-align=center
|Win
|6–0
|align=left| Trini Ruiz
|UD || 10 || 1953-05-13
|align=left| Mexico City, Distrito Federal, Mexico
|align=left|
|-align=center
|Win
|5–0
|align=left| Manuel Armenteros
|UD || 10 || 1953-04-15
|align=left| Mexico City, Distrito Federal, Mexico
|align=left|
|-align=center
|Win
|4–0
|align=left| Giraldo Bacho
|KO || 4  || 1953-03-26
|align=left| Puebla, Puebla, Mexico
|align=left|
|-align=center
|Win
|3–0
|align=left| Memo Sanchez
|TKO || 5  || 1952-12-15
|align=left| Culiacan, Sinaloa, Mexico
|align=left|
|-align=center
|Win
|2–0
|align=left| Chucho Tello
|UD || 10 || 1952-11-22
|align=left| Culiacan, Sinaloa, Mexico
|align=left|
|-align=center
|Win
|1–0
|align=left| Chucho Tello
|UD || 10 || 1952-11-01
|align=left| Culiacan, Sinaloa, Mexico
|align=left|

See also
List of world bantamweight boxing champions
List of Mexican boxing world champions

References

External links 
 
sports-reference

1934 births
2009 deaths
Deaths from cancer in Mexico
20th-century Mexican male actors
Boxers from Mexico City
Boxers at the 1952 Summer Olympics
Olympic boxers of Mexico
Mexican male boxers
Mexican male telenovela actors
Pan American Games bronze medalists for Mexico
Pan American Games medalists in boxing
Boxers at the 1951 Pan American Games
Bantamweight boxers
Medalists at the 1951 Pan American Games